Kyiv University or Shevchenko University or officially the Taras Shevchenko National University of Kyiv, colloquially known as KNU, is located in Kyiv, the capital of Ukraine. The university is recognized as the most prestigious university of Ukraine, being the largest national higher education institution. KNU is ranked within top 650 universities in the world. It is the third oldest university in Ukraine after the University of Lviv and University of Kharkiv. Currently, its structure consists of fifteen faculties (academic departments) and five institutes. It was founded in 1834 by the Russian Tsar Nikolai I as the Saint Vladimir Imperial University of Kiev, and since then it has changed its name several times. During the Soviet Union era, Kiev State University was one of the top-three universities in the USSR, along with Moscow State University and Leningrad State University. It is ranked as the best university in Ukraine in many rankings (see below). Throughout history, the university has produced many famous alumni including Mykola Lysenko, Nikolay Bunge, Mykhailo Drahomanov, Mykhailo Hrushevskyi, Nikolai Berdyaev, Mikhail Bulgakov, Ivan Schmalhausen, Theodosius Dobzhansky, Viacheslav Chornovil, Leonid Kravchuk, and many others. Taras Shevchenko himself, banned from educational activities for political reasons, worked for the university as a field researcher.

The university today
Taras Shevchenko University is renamed after Taras Shevchenko, a major figure in Ukrainian literature and art. It is an institution of higher education that trains specialists in many fields of knowledge and carries out research. It is considered the most prestigious university in Ukraine and a major centre of advanced learning and progressive thinking. It consists of more faculties and departments, and trains specialists in a greater number of academic fields, than any other Ukrainian educational institution.

Nowadays, as it has done throughout its history, the university retains its role of a major center of learning and research as well as an important cultural center. Its academics and students follow the long-standing traditions of the highest academic standards and democratic ideals. At present, the student body of Taras Shevchenko University totals about <30,000 students; this number includes almost 2,000 students at the Institute of International Relations which is attached to Taras Shevchenko University.

As training highly qualified specialists has always been the main goal, the faculties and departments constantly revise their curricula and introduce new programs. A number of faculties offer 4-year Bachelor's and 2-year master's degree programs, together with traditional 5-year Specialist Degree programs. Currently, the stress is on student's ability to work independently and meet employer's requirements, thus practical experience in the field being of foremost importance. The curricula of all Taras Shevchenko University faculties are based on the combination of academic instruction with student's research work and the combination of thorough theoretical knowledge with specific skills. Having acquired theoretical knowledge in the first and the second year, in their third year undergraduates choose an area to specialize in. At the same time they choose a field for their independent study, joining elective special seminars; the results of research are usually presented at the meetings of students' scientific societies or at scientific conferences, the most interesting results are published.

History

Saint Vladimir Imperial University of Kiev

The university was founded in 1834, when the Emperor Nicholas I of Russia (r. 1825–1855) signed the Charter about the creation of the university named after Saint Vladimir, the ruler who Christianized the Kievan Rus'. This name was chosen by the authorities of the Russian Empire, where the role of Orthodox Christianity was immense, and may have reflected the ongoing importance of Kyiv as the cradle of Eastern Christianity for the entire Empire.

The university benefited from assets transferred from Vilnius University, which was closed in the aftermath of the November Uprising of 1831. The first 62 students started their studies at the university in 1834, in its one faculty, the Faculty of Philosophy, which had two departments: the Department of History and Philology and the Department of Physics and Mathematics. There were new additions to the original department in 1835 and 1847: the Faculty of Law and the Faculty of Medicine. Later on, the original Faculty of Philosophy was divided into two separate units: the Faculty of History and Philology and the Faculty of Natural Sciences. There were no more additions to the number of departments until the 1920s.

The walls of the main building are painted in red while the tops and bottoms of its columns are painted black. Ukrainian composer Mykola Leontovych's Shchedryk was premiered at the Kyiv University on December 26, 1916, by the university's choir directed by Oleksandr Koshyts.

Mykhailo Drahomanov University (1920–1932)

In 1920, Saint Vladimir University was renamed as Mykhailo Drahomanov University.

Taras Shevchenko University (from 1939)

In 1939, Saint Vladimir University was renamed after Ukrainian national bard Taras Shevchenko, who had also been briefly employed by the university between 1845 and 1846.

During the German-Soviet war, the university was evacuated to the city of Kizilord in Kazakhstan, where it merged with the National University of Kharkiv to form the United Ukrainian State University. After the liberation of Kyiv in 1943, the university returned to Kyiv. Students and lecturers rebuilt the Humanities and Chemistry buildings and by 15 January 1944, classes resumed for senior undergraduates and for first-years on 1 February.

Since 1960, when the first international students were admitted, over 20,000 highly qualified specialists have been trained at Taras Shevchenko University for 120 countries. The first foreign students of the Taras Shevchenko University came from Cuba, Guinea, Indonesia, Ghana, Togo, Nigeria, Cameroon, Benin, Zanzibar, Yemen, Algeria, and Afghanistan. They continued on to become doctors, engineers, agriculturists, diplomats, economists, and statesmen in their respective countries.

During the Soviet period, the Taras Shevchenko University received one Order of Lenin (1959) and one Order of the October Revolution (1984). Additionally, in 2002 the asteroid 4868 Knushevia was named in honour of Kyiv Taras Shevchenko University.

Rankings and partnerships

University rankings 

Between 2014 and 2017 the university was ranked within top 650 universities in the world according to QS World University Rankings.
In 2009, Delovoy magazine ranked Taras Shevchenko University as the best university in Ukraine, being nationally the strongest in the greatest number of academic fields. According to the independent ranking of 228 universities in Ukraine performed by Compas, Taras Shevchenko University was ranked the first best position in Ukraine regarding the adequacy of alumni to the labor market of Ukraine. 
According to Scopus (2009), Taras Shevchenko University has the highest research paper output of any Ukrainian university, and is also the top research producer (as assessed by total paper citation count).
The university features in the Webometrics Ranking of World Universities (2010) at 1,110 out of 8,000 in the world, at 63 out of top 100 universities of the Central and Eastern Europe, and a leading academic institution in Ukraine.

Foreign partner universities
The university has over 400 partner universities, currently maintains relations and, in some cases, student exchange programs with universities of forty countries; a figure which includes a number of former republics of the Soviet Union and other countries which Ukraine traditionally, over the past 70 years prior to independence in 1991, did not have official bilateral relations with. A small selection of partner universities is displayed below.

And others like Carinthia University of Applied Sciences, Lithuanian University of Educational Sciences, Vidzeme University of Applied Sciences, ADA University etc...

Organisation and administration

Schools / Faculties
These are the 14 faculties and 6 institutes into which the university is divided:

Other institutes

 Astronomical Observatory of the Taras Shevchenko University 
 Ukrainian Humanitarian Lyceum 
 Center of Ukrainian Studies 
 Information & Computer Centre of the Taras Shevchenko University 
 Kaniv Natural Reserved Park of the Taras Shevchenko University 
 KNU Open University – Online study programs 
 Maksymovych Scientific Library 
 Regional Cisco Networking Academy 
 Science Park Taras Shevchenko University of Kyiv
 Scientific and Research Department of the Taras Shevchenko University 
 Ukrainian Physico-Mathematical Lyceum 
 University Botanic Garden named after Academic O. Fomin

Campus
After its initial establishment the university was located in private rooms in Pechersk, and was named for St. Vladimir. Now the main building (built 1837–42 by architect V I Beretti) can be found at 60 Volodymyrska Street, whilst a number of humanities departments are located at 14 Shevchenko Boulevard 14 (formerly the First Kyiv Gymnasium). Furthermore, there are departments located on Akademika Hlushkova Avenue (building 6, built 1954–70) and Vasylkivska Street (Library is located in building No. 90, built in 1939). The university's administration is housed in buildings 58–64 on Volodymyrska Street.

Red University Building

It was constructed from 1837 to 1843 and was built in the late Russian Classicism style, by a Russian architect of Italian descent, Vincent I. Beretti. The building forms an enormous square enclosing a courtyard; the length of the main façade is 145.68m. The walls of the building are painted blood red and the capitals and bases of the portico's columns are painted black, corresponding to the colours of the ribbon of the Order of St. Vladimir (founded in 1782), as Kyiv University used to bear the name of this Order. The motto of the Order, "Benefit, honor and glory" (Pol'za Chest' i Slava) also, subsequently, became the motto of Kyiv University. Local tour guides sometime state that Tsar Nicholas I ordered the entire main building painted red in response to student conscription protests during World War I to remind students of blood spilled by Ukrainian soldiers. The legend does not reflect the historical fact, as the building was painted red before World War I, in 1842. Nicholas I of Russia (1825–1855) died long before World War I (1914–1918). Built at the top of a hill, this building has significantly influenced Kyiv's architectural layout in the 19th century.

Botanical Gardens

The university's A.V. Fomin Botanical Garden (named after Academician Aleksandr V. Fomin, 1869–1935) was founded in 1839 and planned by architect V. Beretti and botanist R. E. Trautfetterom. The total area covered by the garden is around 5.22 hectares; it has a collection of over 10 000 species, forms and varieties of plants.
The garden's greenhouse's height, after reconstruction in 1977, is about 33 meters and is the largest in the world. The university's first orangerie was built in 1846-49 for its collection of tropical and subtropical plants; a collection which has now over two thousand items and is one of the largest in Europe. The gardens are located at the city centre campus, to the rear of the red building; the nearest metro station is Universytet.

Yellow Building and Maksymovych Library

The Humanities Building or "Yellow" building of the university is located at 14 Shevchenko boulevard. Built in 1850–1852, it was designed in the classical style by the architect Alexander Vikentiyovych Beretti (1816–95), son of V. Beretti, the architect of by the main ("red") building. The building initially belonged to the First Gymnasium (a grammar school, in which M. Berlin and M. Kostomarov taught, and where students included the artists Nikolai Ge and V. Levandovskyy, historian M. Zakrevskii, economist M. Bunge, poet M. Herbel, sculptor P. Isabella, writers Bulgakov and K. Paustovsky, and future academics E. Tarle, A. Bogomolets, and A. Lunacharsky). In 1919 the academic Vernadsky, first president of the Academy of Sciences of Ukraine, took up residence in part of the building. Since 1959, the building has been part of the Kyiv National University.

The Maksymovych Library (58 Volodymyrska Street), built in 1939–1940, is a neo-classical building designed by architects V. A. Osmaka and P. Alyoshin as the university's Humanities building. Currently the library holds around 3.5 million books, making it currently the largest research library in Ukraine. The Maksymovych library – along with the No.1 branch of the National Library of Ukraine (62 Volodymyrska Street), designed by the same architects in 1929–1930, and the main ("red") building of the university – forms part of an important and impressive architectural ensemble which is today considered one of Kyiv's key collective architectural monuments.

Architecture
In the 1960s it became imperative that the Kyiv National University acquire more space for its greatly expanded number of departments. It was with this in mind that the building of a complex of new buildings for the university started on the southwestern outskirts of Kyiv (opposite the National Exhibition Centre of Ukraine). The authors of the final project were architects V. I. Ladnyi, M. P. Budylovskyi, V. I. Kolomiets and engineer V. Y. Drizo. 

The Institute of International Relations and Institute of Journalism's joint building at 36 Melnikova Street, developed by Kyivproect architects O Nosenko, I Shpara, Yu Duhovichny, O Klishchuk and Y Vig, was awarded the State Prize of Ukraine in the Field of Architecture in 1995.

Astronomical Observatory
The astronomical observatory of Kyiv National University is located at 3 Observatorna Street; founded in 1845, it was initially planned to place an observatory in the Main Building of the university (as evidenced by existing architectural designs for the red building), however, it was later decided to build for a separate building to house the observatory. This task was again entrusted Vincenty Beretta, it was built in 1841–1845 and officially opened on February 7, 1845.

Accreditation Of Taras Shevchenko National University of Kyiv 

 World Health Organization
 Ministry of Education and Science of Ukraine
 Medical Council of India

Notable alumni

 Borys Oliynyk (poet) (Ukrainian poet, translator and political activist)
 Iryna Bekeshkina (sociologist and policy scholar)
 Yurii Chekan (musicologist, member of the National Union of Composers of Ukraine)
 Theodosius Dobzhansky (a prominent Ukrainian-American geneticist and evolutionary biologist)
 Nataliya Gumenyuk (journalist, teacher)
 Halyna Hai (Ukrainian poet and writer)
 Oleksandr Tkachenko (journalist) journalist, politician, Ukraine's Minister of Culture and Information Policy
 Wladimir Klitschko (Ukrainian former Heavyweight boxing world champion)
 Vitaly Klitschko (Ukrainian former Heavyweight boxing world champion)
 Sonya Koshkina (born 1985), journalist, editor-in-chief
 Makarov Yuriy Volodymyrovych (born 1955), journalist, documentarian
 Dmytro Kuleba (born 1981), Ukrainian Foreign Minister
 Le Thi Tuyet Mai (born 1967), Ambassador and Permanent Representative of the Permanent Mission of Viet Nam to the United Nations Office and the World Trade Organization
 Oksana Zabuzhko (born 1960), (Ukrainian poet and novelist)
 Oleksandra Matviichuk (born 1983), human rights activist and lawyer
 Anastasiia Tsybuliak (born 1984), eco-activist, scientist
 Mikhail Morgulis (Russian-language writer, editor and theologian)
 Igor Newerly (Polish-language novelist and educator)
 Lyudmila Pavlychenko (served in the Red Army during World War II, one of top snipers of all time)
 Maryna Viazovska (Ukrainian Mathematician who solved the sphere-packing problem in dimension 8)
 Iosif Vitebskiy (born 1938; épée fencer, Soviet Ukrainian Olympic medalist and world champion and fencing coach)
 Leonid Vysheslavsky (1914–2002), poet, literary critic, translator
 Bolesław Woytowicz (Polish pianist and composer)
 Tetiana Yakovenko (born 1954), poet, literary critic, teacher
 Svitlana Kyrychenko (1935–2016), human rights activist
 Myroslav Popovych (1930-2018), Ukrainian philosopher
 Solomiia Pavlychko (1958-1999), Ukrainian literary critic, philosopher, feminist, translator
 Igor Volodymyrovych Komarov, director of the Institute of High Technologies of Taras Shevchenko National University of Kyiv
 Lidiia Dunayevska, folklorist, professor

Heads of state, government and international organisations

See also
 4868 Knushevia – asteroid named after Taras Shevchenko University
 Direct action (trade union)
 List of modern universities in Europe (1801–1945)
 National University of Kyiv-Mohyla Academy
 Kyiv National University of Trade and Economics
 Dnipro Choir

References

External links

 
 Taras Shevchenko University 

 
Educational institutions established in 1834
1834 establishments in the Russian Empire
Volodymyrska Street
National universities in Ukraine
Universities and colleges in Kyiv
Institutions with the title of National in Ukraine